Runiz District is a district (bakhsh) in Estahban County, Fars Province, Iran. At the 2006 census, its population was 22,809, in 5,465 families.  The District has one city: Runiz. The District has two rural districts (dehestan): Khir Rural District and Runiz Rural District.

References 

Estahban County
Districts of Fars Province